Maros Water Park is one of water park existing in Maros district, South Sulawesi and was built and ready to soft launch in October 2009. It is planned to be opened in January 2013. It contains outbound area, cottages, restaurant, mini water park, semi olympic pool and body slide. It is surrounded with natural hills, fresh water on site, and with a couple of caves.

References 

Water parks in Indonesia
Buildings and structures in South Sulawesi
Tourist attractions in South Sulawesi
2009 establishments in Indonesia